Acer campestre 'Puncticulatum', or Weeping Speckled Field Maple, is a weeping tree and a cultivar of Acer campestre, the Field Maple. It was first described by Schwerin in 1893. No trees are known to survive of this cultivar.

Description
A weeping tree without a true leader and with pendulous branches forming an umbrella shape similar to A. campestre 'Pendulum' but with leaves speckled and blotched with white like the cultivar 'Pulverulentum'.

Accessions
This cultivar used to be cultivated in Germany and England. The last record, dating from 1925, was from a specimen cultivated at the Royal Botanic Gardens, Kew.

Synonymy
Acer campestre f. puncticulatum Schwer, (1893) 
Acer campestre var. pendulum-foliis-variegatis G.Nicholson (1902).
Acer campestre var. pendulum-variegatum G.Nicholson (1925).
Acer campestre pendulum pulverulentum hort.

References

Field maple cultivars
Weeping trees
Extinct cultivars
pms:Acer campestre